John Tilley may refer to:

 John Tilley (Mayflower passenger) (1571–1620/1), pilgrim on the Mayflower signer of the Mayflower Compact
 John Tilley, whose invention in 1813 gave rise to the Tilley lamp
 Sir John Tilley (civil servant) (1813–1898), Secretary to the UK's General Post Office
 John Tilley (baseball) (1854–1927), baseball player
 John Tilley (diplomat) (1869–1952), British diplomat to Brazil and Japan
 John Tilley (entertainer) (1898–1935), British comic monologuist
 John Tilley (English politician) (1941–2005), British Labour Party politician
 John Tilley (Kentucky politician), American politician